Air Wisconsin Flight 965 (registration N650S) was a flight operated by Air Wisconsin that crashed near Valley, Nebraska, on June 12, 1980. The crash was caused by poor weather conditions making the engines fail and failure to recontrol the aircraft.

Accident
The aircraft operating Flight 965, a Swearingen SA226-TC Metro II, left Outagamie County Regional Airport on a one-stop flight to Lincoln Municipal Airport at 12:45 on June 12, 1980. The flight stopped at Minneapolis-St. Paul International Airport and then continued on to Lincoln Municipal Airport.

While en route but nearing its destination the aircraft experienced severe turbulence and was cleared to successively lower altitudes in an attempt to avoid the turbulence. During the descent the aircraft entered a region of severe precipitation, which caused both engines to flame-out due to very high levels of water ingestion. The crew managed to re-light both engines but lost control and impacted the ground. The aircraft struck the ground in a slightly nose down and right wing low attitude, bounced and then struck the ground a second time, sliding along the ground coming to a rest inverted. Both crew and eleven of the thirteen passengers were killed in the accident.

Aircraft
The accident aircraft, SA-226TC Metro II c/n TC-228, had flown a total of 8055 hours and had first flown in 1976. There were no failures of the aircraft or its systems reported before the crash, or discovered by the investigation team.

Investigation
The investigation focused on why the aircraft was flown deliberately into a region of very extreme weather, without air traffic control informing the crew of the weather or the on-board weather detection system indicating the extreme weather.

Causes
The direct cause of the crash was determined as flight into extreme weather causing the engines to flame-out and failure to maintain control during the recovery. Contributory causes were the failure of air traffic services to warn of the extreme weather and the inability of the aircraft's weather radar to penetrate even moderate precipitation, leaving the crew unaware of the extreme precipitation in the weather ahead.

See also
Southern Airways Flight 242
TACA Flight 110

Notes

Accidents and incidents involving the Fairchild Swearingen Metroliner
Aviation accidents and incidents caused by air traffic controller error
1980 in Nebraska
Aviation accidents and incidents in the United States in 1980
Airliner accidents and incidents caused by engine failure
June 1980 events in the United States